Life Risking Romance is a 2016 South Korean-Chinese film directed by Song Min-kyu. It stars Ha Ji-won, Chun Jung-myung and Chen Bolin.

Plot 
Je-in is a mystery novel writer who chases after a serial killer with her longtime detective friend Rok-hwan. However, a love triangle kicks into gear when they come across Jason, an attractive and mysterious man with sharp probing skills.

Cast
 Ha Ji-won as Han Je-in 
 Lee Da-in as Han Je-in (teens)
 Lee Chae-mi as Han Je-in (young)
 Chun Jung-myung as Seol Rok-hwan 
 Jo Byung-gyu as Seol Rok-hwan (teens)
 Choi Ro-woon as Seol Rok-hwan (young)
 Chen Bolin as Jason Chen
 Oh Jung-se as Heo Jong-goo
 Yoon So-hee as Jung Yoo-mi
 Song Chae-yoon as Author Byun
 Kim Won-hae as Senior Patrol Officer Park
 Jung Hae-gyun as CEO Ji
 Yoon Kyung-ho as Police Chief / Noh Duk-Sool
 Kim Hee-chan as Ui-kyung
 Haha as (cameo)

Production
Filming commenced on September 6, 2015, in Itaewon, and ended on December 5, 2015, in Paju.

References

External links

Life Risking Romance at Naver Movies 

2010s Korean-language films
South Korean romantic comedy films
South Korean romantic thriller films
Chinese romantic comedy films
2016 films
2016 romantic comedy films
2010s romantic thriller films
Chinese thriller films
2010s English-language films
2010s South Korean films